The Poison is the debut studio album by Welsh heavy metal band Bullet for My Valentine. The album was released on 3 October 2005 through Visible Noise Records in the UK, and on 14 February 2006 in the United States, through Trustkill Records. The album included 11 new songs and two previously heard songs, "Cries in Vain", which was previously heard from the band's self-titled UK EP and from their US EP, Hand of Blood, as well as from "4 Words (To Choke Upon)" was previously included on the same US release. Different editions of the album contain the song "Hand of Blood", previously heard from these EPs, replacing "Spit You Out".

The album debuted at number 128 on the Billboard 200 and number 2 on the Heatseekers Chart, and as of 30 January 2018, the album has sold 1,600,000 copies worldwide and 500,000 copies in the US. It is the band's most commercially successful effort in the United States, earning a gold certification by the  Recording Industry Association of America (RIAA) in addition to a gold certification from the band's native British Phonographic Industry (BPI) and a platinum certification by Bundesverband Musikindustrie (BVMI) in Germany.

Reception

Corey Apar of AllMusic awarded the album 3 stars out of 5, commenting that the album showed a "melodic metal-meets-emo aesthetic" peppered with "powerful riffs and classic metal". Apar concluded that the album "is a well-produced, solid effort – but seeing as they're now trying to take over American hearts, it would be nice to see future attempts to distinguish themselves more from the new-school pack." Sputnikmusic also gave the album a 3 out of 5 with the explanation that it is "fun to listen to, and the guitar work sure is nice. The vocals are good as well, as main singer has a good voice, melodic and screamed, well supported by the screaming of the bassist." Music Emissions said the album contained very catchy songs, with clean and fast guitar sounds, and "an undertone of pop" which fits with the drumming. Despite its positive points, the reviewer said that the album would not attract people from outside the metalcore subgenre.

Stylus Magazine gave the album a C− (below average) and said that The Poison album appeared to be made for provincial 15-year-olds to get violent with each other. The reviewer noted two songs that were indicative of the band's "A-game": "The Poison" and "Suffocating Under Words of Sorrow (What Can I Do)". Punknews.org wrote that the album was "drab", leaving the reviewer bored with the slow pace, and frustrated that the screaming loud passages were delivered without a sense of anger or attitude.

Track listing

Personnel

Bullet for My Valentine
 Matthew Tuck – lead vocals, rhythm guitar, additional lead guitar, bass (uncredited)
 Michael "Padge" Paget – lead guitar, backing vocals
 Jason "Jay" James – bass (credited but doesn't perform), backing vocals 
 Michael "Moose" Thomas – drums, percussion

Additional musicians
 Eicca Toppinen – arrangement (on "Intro")
 Apocalyptica – cellos (on "Intro")

Production details
 All lyrics by Matt Tuck
 All music by Bullet for My Valentine
Except "Intro" cellos by Apocalyptica, arrangement by Eicca Toppinen
Except "Welcome Home (Sanitarium)" by Metallica
Published by Harmageddon Publishing Ltd / Universal Music Publishing SAS
 All tracks produced & mixed by Colin Richardson
Except "Hit the Floor" produced & mixed by Colin Richardson & Andy Sneap
 All tracks mixed at The Chapel, Lincolnshire
Except "4 Words (To Choke Upon)" mixed at The Sonic Ranch, El Paso, Texas
Except "Hit the Floor" mixed at Backstage Studios, Derbyshire
 Engineered by Dan Turner
 Engineering assistance by Will Bartle, Matt Hyde & Justin Leigh
 Recorded at The Chapel (Lincolnshire), Backstage Studios (Derbyshire), Notting Pill Studios (Newport) & SUSI Studios (Finland)
 A&R – Martin Dodd
 A&R UK – Julie Weir
 Worldwide management – Paul Craig at Supervision Management Ltd 
 Agent – Paul Ryan at The Agency Group (excluding US)
 Artwork by S2 at laboca.co.uk
 Video footage filmed and edited by Dan Fernbach at Static Films
 Band photographs by Patrick Ford

Charts

Singles

Album

Certifications

References

 

2005 debut albums
Bullet for My Valentine albums
Trustkill Records albums
Visible Noise albums
Metalcore albums by Welsh artists